is a railway station in the city of Okazaki, Aichi Prefecture, Japan, operated by the third sector Aichi Loop Railway Company.

Lines

Station layout
The station has a single elevated island platform serving two tracks, with the station building located underneath. The station building has automated ticket machines, TOICA automated turnstiles and is staffed.

Platforms

Adjacent stations

Station history
Kitano-Masuzuka Station was opened on October 1, 1970, as a freight station on the Japanese National Railways (JNR), primarily to support the operations of nearby factories of Toyota Motors and its affiliated companies. Scheduled passenger operations began from April 26, 1976. Freight operations were discontinued from January 1, 1985. With the privatization of JNR on April 1, 1987, the station came under the control of JR Central. The station was transferred to the Aichi Loop Railway Company on January 31, 1988. The station was expanded with the addition of another track on December 23, 2001, in preparation for the 2005 Aichi World Exposition.

Passenger statistics
In fiscal 2017, the station was used by an average of 1068 passengers daily.

Surrounding area
 Aichi Loop Railway Co Ltd head office
Aichi Loop Railway rail yard

See also
 List of railway stations in Japan

References

External links

Official home page 

Railway stations in Japan opened in 1970
Railway stations in Aichi Prefecture
Okazaki, Aichi